Wayne Caines is a Bermudian politician currently serving as a member of the House of Assembly of Bermuda representing Devonshire North West for the Progressive Labour Party.

Caines served as Minister of National Security from July 2017 until his resignation in July 2020. Caines in now the President and CEO of Bermuda Electric Light Company Limited (BELCO) and President and Chairman of Liberty Bermuda

Education and career
Caines is a graduate of Oakwood University in Huntsville, Alabama, the University of Kent and the Royal Military Academy Sandhurst.

Prior to entering politics, Caines served as a Captain within the Bermuda Regiment, Crown Counsel at the Department of Public Prosecutions, CEO if Digicel Bermuda for 8 years, and CEO of SENIAC Consulting. 

Wayne is a strategic and results orientated leader, trusted board advisor and industry official. Passionate about driving results through strategic planning, leadership development, change management and mergers and acquisitions. Skilled at enhancing bottom line performance and increasing shareholder value while consistently cultivating ties with boards, customers, regulators, employees and community.

In 2013 Caines and his twin brother Dwayne wrote a book "Double Vision: A Journey to Success".  Double Vision is a poignant story by twin brothers, Wayne and Dwayne Caines, which chronicles their adventurous journey from childhood to manhood. The book explores the challenges of young men struggling to find their identity and purpose in life.

Political career
Prior to entering Parliament, Caines was Chief of Staff in the Office of the Premier. He then served as a Progressive Labour Party Senator, becoming Junior Minister of Tourism, Transport, Environment and Sport.

Following the Progressive Labour Party victory at the 2017 election, in which Caines was re-elected as member for Devonshire North West, Caines was appointed as Minister of National Security. Caines was re-elected on 2020.

References

Living people
Alumni of the University of Kent
Bermudian businesspeople
20th-century Bermudian lawyers
Bermudian military personnel
Government ministers of Bermuda
Graduates of the Royal Military Academy Sandhurst
Members of the House of Assembly of Bermuda
Members of the Senate of Bermuda
Progressive Labour Party (Bermuda) politicians
Oakwood University alumni
Year of birth missing (living people)